Saadia or Saadiya is an Arabic, Hebrew and Berber masculine and feminine proper name. It is used as a forename and more rarely as a surname.  According to some classical rabbinical sources, the name derives from the Hebrew verb Sa'ad (support), and means "God has supported". According to researchers at the Wissenschaft des Judentums, however, it is an artificially Hebrewised form of the Arabic name Sa'id (Happy سعيد). It is indeed common that in Arabic speaking countries, people called Saadia are also known as Sa'id.

Saadia Gaon, who seems to have been the first to have borne this forename, and is often just referred to as "Saadia," without further explanation; signing himself 'Sa'id ben Yosef "at the beginning of his career, he went on, in his work 'Sefer haGalouï' to call himself "Saadyahou" (סעדיהו) ; Moses ibn Ezra also uses the form Sa'adel (סעדאל).

People with the given name
Saadia Gaon, rabbi, Jewish philosopher, and exegete of the Geonic period
Saadia Ibn Danan (died 1493), rabbi, poet, and Dayan in Grenada
Saadia Marciano (1950–2007), Israeli social activist, politician, and founder of the Black Panthers
Saadia Himi (born 1984), Dutch model and beauty queen
Saadia Kobashi (1904–1990), leader of Yemenite Jews in Israel and one of the signatories to Israel's declaration of independence
Saadiya Kochar, Indian woman photographer and solo traveller

See also
Saadia (disambiguation)
[[Saadia naif alzaidy

References

Hebrew masculine given names
Hebrew feminine given names
Arabic feminine given names

fr:Saadia (homonymie)